USS LST-222 was a  in the United States Navy during World War II. She was transferred to the Philippine Navy as RPS Mindoro Occidental (LT-93).

Construction and career 
LST-222 was laid down on 16 March 1943 at Chicago Bridge and Iron Co., Seneca, Illinois. Launched on 17 August 1943 and commissioned on 10 September 1943.

Service in the United States Navy 
During World War II, LST-222 was assigned to the Asiatic-Pacific theater. She then participated in the Invasion of Normandy from 6 to 25 June 1944.

She participated in the occupation of Kwajalein and Majuro Atolls from 31 January to 8 February 1944 and also the occupation of Saipan from 15 to 24 June 1944. Tinian capture and occupation from 24 to 28 July 1944. Capture and occupation of southern Palau Islands, 6 September 14 October 1944

On 15 September 1945, she was converted into a Landing Ship, Tank (Hospital) and was reclassified LST(H)-222.

She assigned to Occupation service in the Far East from 17 October 1945 to 5 February 1946.

She was decommissioned in February 1946 and came under the Commander Naval Forces Far East (COMNAVFE) Shipping Control Authority for Japan (SCAJAP), redesignated Q044.

Transferred to the Military Sea Transportation Service (MSTS), 31 March 1952, and placed in service as USNS T-LST-222.

LST-222 was struck from the Navy Register on 15 July 1972 and transferred to the Philippines.

Service in the Philippine Navy 
She was acquired by the Philippine Navy on 15 July 1972 and renamed RPS Mindoro Occidental (LT-93).

On 19 April 1974, a 20 day marathon on bicycles named Tour of Luzon-Visayas with 200 participants boarded the ship at South Harbor in order to continue the marathon in Tolosa.

On 11 January 1981, BRP Mindoro Occidental carried relief goods to Samar after a tropical storm had hit the area.

She was possibly sold as scrap in the early 1990s.

Awards 
LST-222 have earned the following awards:

American Campaign Medal
Asiatic-Pacific Campaign Medal (4 battle stars) 
Navy Occupation Medal (with Asia clasp)
World War II Victory Medal

Citations

Sources 
 
 
 
 

World War II amphibious warfare vessels of the United States
Ships built in Seneca, Illinois
1943 ships
LST-1-class tank landing ships of the United States Navy
LST-1-class tank landing ships of the Philippine Navy